Donald Philip Deeks (February 10, 1923 – September 4, 1995) was an American football offensive lineman in the National Football League for the Boston Yanks, the Washington Redskins, and the Green Bay Packers.  He played college football at the University of Washington and was drafted in the fourth round of the 1945 NFL Draft.

1923 births
1995 deaths
American football offensive guards
American football offensive tackles
Washington Huskies football players
Boston Yanks players
Washington Redskins players
Green Bay Packers players
Players of American football from Portland, Oregon